Karacaören is a village in Bor district of Niğde Province, Turkey. It is located in the northern slopes of the Taurus Mountains. The population of Karacaoren was 163 as of 2011.

References 

Villages in Bor District, Niğde